Philippe Suywens (born December 12, 1971) is a former professional footballer who played as a striker.

Suywens played professional football in Ligue 2 with Chamois Niortais F.C. before moving to amateur football with SO Châtellerault.

See also
Football in France
List of football clubs in France

References

External links
Philippe Suywens profile at chamoisfc79.fr

1971 births
Living people
French footballers
Association football forwards
Valenciennes FC players
Chamois Niortais F.C. players
US Créteil-Lusitanos players
La Roche VF players
Ligue 2 players
Vendée Poiré-sur-Vie Football players
SO Châtellerault players